Hot Club of 52nd Street is a live jazz quartet album co-led by guitarists Bucky Pizzarelli and Howard Alden in tribute to Django Reinhardt, released on May 25, 2004.

It derives its name from Manhattan's 52nd Street which is sometimes referred to as "Swing Street" because of the jazz clubs located along the west side.

Track listing
 Rosetta4:42  
 On the Sunny Side of the Street6:23  
 Tangerine5:39  
 Nuages6:42  
 Strike Up the Band5:15  
 Some of These Days4:07  
 Avalon5:02  
 Melancholy Baby6:10  
 I've Got Rhythm5:59

Personnel
 Bucky PizzarelliGuitar, co-leader 
 Howard AldenGuitar, co-leader 
 Johnny FrigoViolin 
 Michael MooreBass

Reception

Ken Dryden of Allmusic had praise for Hot Club of 52nd Street but felt the crowd's applause overtook the live music and made it hard to hear.

References

Bucky Pizzarelli albums
Live swing albums
2004 live albums